Juha Turunen (born 22 September 1964 in Turku, now known as Juha Louhi) is a Finnish criminal and former SDP city council candidate living in Turku, who confessed to a kidnapping in 2009.

Kidnapping
Minna Nurminen, a 26-year-old member of a wealthy Finnish family, disappeared from her home in Etu-Töölö, Helsinki, on 27 May 2009, and was reported missing on 30 May. She was later found on 13 June, in a forest in Rusko.

Police arrested Juha Turunen and he confessed to the kidnapping. He is said to have asked for a ransom of 8 million euro for Nurminen, which her family paid him. Part of this ransom, in the form of 100 euro banknotes, was found by chance in a parking hall in Turku on 12 June.

He hid millions of euros around Turku. The police said they probably recovered all of it.

Several authorities provided assistance to police, including Finnish Defence Forces, Border Guard and Customs.

Turunen is said to have planned the crime for several months, and to even have bought an apartment in the centre of Turku specifically for the purpose of keeping Nurminen prisoner there. During the whole time, Turunen also lived a perfectly normal family life with his wife and three underage children, all of whom were oblivious to the crime.

The only apparent motive Turunen has had for the crime is simple lust for money. He has had nothing against Nurminen or her family.

Course of events
Turunen originally approached his victim in her home in Etu-Töölö by posing as a mailman having a package to deliver to her. When Nurminen opened the door, Turunen knocked her down to the floor, tied her up, and placed her inside a large wooden box he had brought with him. Turunen then brought this box with him all the way to the apartment in central Turku, where he released Nurminen from the box and left her in the apartment's specifically modified bedroom. For two weeks, Nurminen's only contact with the outside world was a television set and Turunen feeding her once per day. After the ransom was paid, Turunen brought Nurminen to a forest in Rusko, where she had to remain alone for several hours, until the police were able to locate and safely retrieve her.

References

1964 births
2009 in Finland
21st-century Finnish criminals
Finnish male criminals
Finnish people convicted of kidnapping
Living people
People from Turku